Action Jackson may refer to:

People
 Lamar Jackson (born 1997), American football quarterback
 William Jackson (gangster) (1920–1961), American gangster

Other uses
Action Jackson (1988 film), an American action film
Action Jackson: Original Soundtrack Album
 Action Jackson (2014 film), an Indian action comedy film
 Action Jackson (toy), a product line of action figures